Caxton Press (formerly known as Caxton Printers, a division of its parent company, The Caxton Printers Ltd.) is a book publisher located in Caldwell, Idaho, United States, founded in 1925.   It is also a distributor of books from the University of Idaho Press, Black Canyon Communications, Snake Country Publishing, Historic Idaho Series and Alpha Omega Publishing.  It was founded by J. H. Gipson to give western writers, particularly of non-fiction about the people or culture of the Western United States, a vehicle for publication of their work.

History 
It is the publishing division of The Caxton Printers Ltd., founded in Caldwell in 1895 by A. E. Gipson, as the Gem State Rural Publishing Company, renamed to its present name in 1903. Regular publishing of books began in 1925.  The Caxton Printers was named after William Caxton, printer of the first-ever book in English, in 1474.  

The publishing division was itself named Caxton Printers until around 1995, when it was changed to Caxton Press in order to differentiate it from the parent company,  which now also engages in non-publishing business, including selling office supplies and school supplies.

University of Idaho Press
The University of Idaho Press is a university press that is associated with the University of Idaho; the press is a division of Caxton Press.

See also

 List of English-language book publishing companies
 List of university presses
 Lawrence H. Gipson

References

External links
 Caxton Press website

Book publishing companies of the United States
Publishing companies established in 1925
American companies established in 1925
Caldwell, Idaho
Companies based in Idaho